The 13423 / 13424 Bhagalpur–Ajmer Express is an Express train belonging to Eastern Railway zone that runs between  and  in India. It is currently being operated with 13423/13424 train numbers on a weekly basis.

Service

The 13423/Bhagalpur–Ajmer Express has an average speed of 50 km/hr and covers 1749 km in 34h 50m. The 13424/Ajmer–Bhagalpur Weekly Express has an average speed of 49 km/hr and covers 1749 km in 35h 35m. The 13424 is the only train which doesn't stop at Allahabad Chheoki junction.

Route & halts

The important halts of the train are:

 
 
 
 
 
 
 
 
 
 
 
 
 
 
 
 
 
 
 Note:- 13423 has no stoppage at  going towards Ajmer Junction.

Coach composition

The train has advanced LHB rakes with max speed of 160 kmph. The train consists of 22 coaches:

 2 AC II Tier
 3 AC III Tier
 11 Sleeper coaches
 4 General
 2 EOGs

Traction

Both trains are hauled by a Howrah Loco Shed-based WAP-7 locomotive from Bhagalpur to Ajmer Junction and vice versa.

Direction reversal

Train reverses its direction 2 times:

Rake sharing 

The train shares its rake with 12349/12350 Bhagalpur–New Delhi Weekly Superfast Express

Notes

References

External links 

 13423/Bhagalpur-Ajmer Express India Rail Info
 13424/Ajmer-Bhagalpur Express India Rail Info

Transport in Bhagalpur
Transport in Ajmer
Express trains in India
Rail transport in Madhya Pradesh
Rail transport in Rajasthan
Rail transport in Bihar
Rail transport in Uttar Pradesh
Railway services introduced in 2012